This is a list of state leaders in the 18th century (1701–1800) AD, of British South Asia. 

These polities are often sovereign states and then vassal states under a subsidiary alliance to the British East India Company. Afghan monarchies and non-British colonies are listed at List of state leaders in the 18th century#Asia: South.

Main 

British East India: Company rule in India
Joint-stock colony under the East India Company, 1757–1858
For details see the United Kingdom under British Isles, Europe
See also the list of princely states of British India (alphabetical) for all princely states

Bengal and Northeast India 

Ahom kingdom (complete list) –
Sukhrungphaa, King (1696–1714)
Sutanphaa, King (1714–1744)
Sunenphaa, King (1744–1751)
Suremphaa, King (1751–1769)
Sunyeophaa, King (1769–1780)
Suhitpangphaa, King (1780–1795)
Suklingphaa, King (1795–1811)

Bengal Subah (complete list) –
Murshid Quli Khan, Nawab (1717–1727)
Sarfaraz Khan, Nawab (1727–1727)
Shuja-ud-Din Muhammad Khan, Nawab (1727–1739)
Sarfaraz Khan, Nawab (1739–1740)
Alivardi Khan, Nawab (1740–1756)
Siraj ud-Daulah, Nawab (1756–1757)
Jafar Ali Khan, Nawab (1757–1760, 1763–1765)
Qasim, Nawab (1760–1763)
Najmuddin Ali Khan, Nawab (1765–1766)
Najabat Ali Khan, Nawab (1766–1770)
Ashraf Ali Khan, Nawab (1770)
Mubarak Ali Khan, Nawab (1770–1793)
Baber Ali Khan, Nawab (1793–1810)

Bhurshut (complete list) –
Lakshminarayan, Maharaja (c.1695–1712)

Cooch Behar (complete list) –
Rup Narayan, Raja (1693–1714)
Upendra Narayana, Raja (1714–1763)
Debendra Narayana, Raja (1763–1765)
Regent (1763–1765)
Dhairjendra Narayan, Raja (1765–1770, 1775–1783)
Rajendra I Narayan, Raja (1770–1772)
Pensuthma, Regent (1770–1772)
Dharendra Narayan, Raja (1772, 1774–1775)
Bijendra Narayan, Raja (1772–1774)
Regents (1783–1801)
Harendra Narayan, Raja (1783–1839)

Jaintia Kingdom –
Ram Singh I, King (1694–1708)
Jay Narayan, King (1708–1731)
Bar Gosain, King (1731–1770)
Chattra Singh, King (1770–1780)
Bijay Narayan, King (1780–1790)
Ram Singh II, King (1790–1832)

Mallabhum (complete list) –
Durjan Singha Dev, King (1682–1702)
Raghunath Singha Dev II, King (1702–1712)
Gopal Singha Dev, King (1712–1748)
Chaitanya Singha Dev, King (1748–1801)

Kingdom of Manipur (complete list) –
Chalailongpa, King (1697–1709)
Gharib Nawaz, King (1709–1754)
Chit Sain, King (1754–1756)
Gaurisiam, King (1756–1763)
Ching-Thang Khomba, King (1764–1798)
Rohinchandra, King (1798–1801)

Kingdom of Sikkim (complete list) –
Chakdor Namgyal, Chogyal (1700–1717)
Gyurmed Namgyal, Chogyal (1717–1733)
Phuntsog Namgyal II, Chogyal (1733–1780)
Tenzing Namgyal, Chogyal (1780–1793)
Tsugphud Namgyal, Chogyal (1793–1863)

Twipra Kingdom –
Dharma Manikya II, King (1714–1733)
Vijay Manikya III, King (1743–1760)
Krishna Manikya, King (1760–1761)
Rajdhar Manikya, King (1783–1804)

Bhutan 

Bhutan (complete list) –
Gedun Chomphel, Druk Desis (1695–1701)
Ngawang Tshering, Druk Desis (1701–1704)
Umze Peljor, Druk Desis (1704–1707)
Druk Rabgye, Druk Desis (1707–1719)
Ngawang Gyamtsho, Druk Desis (1719–1729)
Mipham Wangpo, Druk Desis (1729–1736)
Khuwo Peljor, Druk Desis (1736–1739)
Ngawang Gyaltshen, Druk Desis (1739–1744)
Sherab Wangchuck, Druk Desis (1744–1763)
Druk Phuntsho, Druk Desis (1763–1765)
Wangzob Druk Tenzin I, Druk Desis (1765–1768)
Sonam Lhundub, Druk Desis (1768–1773)
Kunga Rinchen, Druk Desis (1773–1776)
Jigme Singye, Druk Desis (1776–1788)
Druk Tenzin, Druk Desis (1788–1792)
Umzey Chapchhab, Druk Desis (1792–1792)
Sonam Gyaltshen (Tashi Namgyel), Druk Desis (1792–1799)
Druk Namgyel, Druk Desis (1799–1803)

Burma 

Hsipaw (complete list) –
Hso Wai Hpa, Saopha (1675–1702)
Sao Okka Wara, Saopha (1702–1714)
Sao Okka Seya, Saopha (1714–1718)
Sao Sam Myo, Saopha (1718–1722)
Sao Hkun Neng, Saopha (1722–1752)
Sao Sawra Tawta, Saopha (1752–1767)
Sao Myat San Te, Saopha (1767–1788)
Sao Hswe Kya, Saopha (1788–1809)

Kengtung (complete list) –
Sao Möng Lek, Saopha (?–1730)
Sao Maung Hkawn, Saopha (1730–c.1735, 1739–1742)
Sao Möng Hsam, Saopha (1742–1786)
Sao Kawng Tai I, Saopha (1787–1802, 1814–1815)

India 

Ajaigarh (complete list) –
Guman Singh, Raja (1765–1792)
Bakht Singh, Raja (1792–1793)
Ali Bahadur, usurper Raja (1793–1802)

Akkalkot (complete list) –
Fatehsinh I Raje Bhosle, Chief (1707–1760)
Shahaji I, Chief (1760–1789)
Fatehsinh II, Chief (1789–1822)

Alirajpur (complete list) –
Udai Deo, Rana (?)
Pahad Deo II, Rana (?–1765)
Pratap Singh I, Rana (1765–1818)

Alwar (complete list) –
Partap Singh, Raja (1770–1791)
Bakhtawar Singh Prabhakar, Raja (1791–1815)

Arakkal kingdom (complete list) –
Ali II, Raja (1691–1704)
Kunhi Amsa I, Raja (1704–1720)
Muhammad Ali IV, Raja (1720–1728)
Bibi Harrabichi Kadavube, Raja (1728–1732)
Bibi Junumabe I, Raja (1732–1745)
Kunhi Amsa II, Raja (1745–1777)
Bibi Junumabe II, Raja (1777–1819)

Balasinor (complete list) –
Sardar Muhammed khan Babi 28 September, Nawab Babi (1758–?)
Jamiyat Khanji Muhammad Khanji, Nawab Babi (18th century–?)

Banganapalle (complete list) –
Muhammad Beg Khan-i-lung, Kiladar (1686–1725)
Ata Khan, Kiladar (1725–1728)
Fazil `Ali Khan I, Kiladar (1728–1737)
Fazil `Ali Kahn II, Kiladar (1737–1769)
Saiyid Husain Ali Khan, Kiladar (1769–1783)
Muhammad Yusuf -Mysore Administrator, Kiladar (1784–1790)
Mozaffar al-Molk Asad `Ali Khan, Kiladar (1790–1814)
Gholam `Ali Khan I, Kiladar (1790–1822)

Bansda (complete list) –
Virsimhji I, Raja Sahib (1701–1716)
Ralbhamji, Raja Sahib (1716–1739)
Ghulabsimhji I, Raja Sahib (1739–1753)
Udaisimhji III, Raja Sahib (1753–1770)
Kiratsimhji Las, Raja Sahib (1770–1780)
Virsimhji II, Raja Sahib (1780–1789)
Naharsimhji, Raja Sahib (1789–1793)
Raisimhji, Raja Sahib (1793–1815)

Banswara (complete list) –
Ajab Singh, Rai Rayan (1688–1706)
Bhim Singh, Rai Rayan (1706–1713)
Bishan Singh, Rai Rayan (1713–1737)
Udai Singh II, Rai Rayan (1737–1747)
Prithvi Singh, Rai Rayan (1747–1786)
Bijai Singh, Rai Rayan (1786–1816)

Baoni (complete list) –
Ghazi ud-Din Khan Feroze Jung III, Nawab (1784–1800)
Naser ad-Dowla, Nawab (1800–1815)

Baraundha (complete list) –
Mohan Singh, Thakur (1790–1827)

Baria (complete list) –
Mansimhji I Vijaysimhji, Raja (?–c.1720)
Prithvirajji I Mansimhji, Raja (18th century)
Rayadharji Prithviraji, Raja (18th century)
Gangdasji I Rayadharji, Raja (18th century)
Gambhirsimhji Gangdasji, Raja (18th century)
Dhiratsimhji Gambhirsimhji, Raja (18th–19th century)

Baroda: Gaekwad dynasty (complete list) –
Pilaji Rao Gaekwad, Maharaja (1721–1732)
Damaji Rao Gaekwad, Maharaja (1732–1768)
Govind Rao Gaekwad, Maharaja (1768–1771, 1793–1800)
Sayaji Rao Gaekwad I, Maharaja (1771–1789)
Manaji Rao Gaekwad, Maharaja (1789–1793)
Anand Rao Gaekwad, Maharaja (1800–1818)

Barwani (complete list) –
Parbat Singh, Rana (1700–1708)
Mohan Singh I, Rana (1708–1730)
Anup Singh, Rana (1730–1760)
Umed Singh, Rana (1760–1794)
Mohan Singh II, Rana (1794–1839)

Benares (complete list) –
Mansa Ram, Zamindar (1737–1740)
Balwant Singh, Raja (1740–1770)
Chait Singh, Raja (1770–1781)
Mahipat Narayan Singh, Raja (1781–1795)
Udit Narayan Singh, Raja (1795–1835)

Bharatpur (complete list) –
Badan Singh, Maharaja (1722–1756)
Suraj Mal, Maharaja (1756–1763)
Jawahar Singh, Maharaja (1763–1768)
Ratan Singh, Maharaja (1768–1769)
Keshri Singh, Maharaja (1769–1771)
Nahar Singh, Maharaja (1771–1776)
Ranjit Singh, Maharaja (1776–1805)

Bhavnagar (complete list) –
Ratanji, Thakur Sahib (1660–1703)
Bhavsinhji I Ratanji, Thakur Sahib (1703–1764)
Akherajji II Bhavsinhji, Thakur Sahib (1764–1772)
Wakhatsinhji Akherajji, Thakur Sahib (1772–1816)

Bhopal (complete list) –
Dost Mohammad Khan, Nawab (1707–1728)
Sultan Muhammad Khan, Nawab (1728–1742)
Yar Mohammad Khan, Regent (1728–1742)
Faiz Mohammad Khan, Nawab (1742–1777)
Hayat Mohammad Khan, Nawab (1777–1807)

Bhor (complete list) –
Shankaraji Narayan Sacheev, Pant Sachiv (1697–1707)
Naro Shankaraji, Pant Sachiv (1707–1737)
Chimnaji I, Pant Sachiv (1737–1757)
Sadasiv Rao, Pant Sachiv (1757–1787)
Raghunath Rao, Pant Sachiv (1787–1791)
Shankr Rao I, Pant Sachiv (1797–1798)
Pantsachiv Chimnaji Rao II, Pant Sachiv (1798–1827)

Bijawar (complete list) –
Bir Singh Deo, Raja (1765–1793)
Himmat Bahadur, usurper Raja (1793–1802)

Bikaner
Maharajas (complete list) –
Sujan Singh, Maharaja (1700–1735)
Zorawar Singh, Maharaja (1735–1746)
Gaj Singh, Maharaja (1746–1787)
Raj Singh II, Maharaja (1787–1787)
Pratap Singh, Maharaja (1787–1787)
Surat Singh, Regent (?–1787), Maharaja (1787–1828)
Dewans (complete list) –
Anand Ram Khawas, Dewan (early 18th century–1733)
Mohta Bakhtawar Singh, Dewan (1735–1751, 1752–1756, 1757–1762, 1765–1779)
Amar Singh Chaturbhujani, Dewan (1751–1752)
Mohta Prithvi Singh, Dewan (1756–1757)
Shah Mool Chand Bardiya, Dewan (1762–1765)
Mohta Swaroop Singh, Dewan (1779–1780s)
Mohta Thakursi, Dewan (1780s–1787)
Mohta Madho Rai, Dewan (1787–1791)
Pratap Mal Baid, Dewan (1791–1794)
Mohta Rao Sahib Singh Gun Roop, Dewan (1794–1805)

Bilaspur (complete list) –
Ajmer Chand, Raja (1692–1728)
Devi Chand, Raja (1738–1778)
Mahan Chand, Raja (1778–1824)

Bundi (complete list) –
Budh Singh, Rao Raja (1696–1730)
Dalel Singh, Rao Raja (1730–1749)
Umaid Singh, Rao Raja (1749–1770, 1773–1804)
Ajit Singh, Rao Raja (1770–1773)

Cambay (complete list) –
Mirza Jaffar Mumin Khan I, Nawab (1730–1742)
Nur-ud-din Muftakher Khan, Nawab (1742–1743)
Najm ad-Dawla Ja`far Mu´min Khan II, Nawab (1743–1784)
Mohammad Qoli Khan, Nawab (1784–1790)
Fath `Ali Khan, Nawab (1790–1823)

Chamba (complete list) –
Jit Singh, Raja (1794–1808)
Charhat Singh, Raja (1808–1844)
Shri Singh, Raja (1844–1870)
Gopal Singh, Raja (1870–1873)
Sham Singh, Raja (1873–1904)

Charkhari (complete list) –
Khuman Singh, Raja (1765–1782)
Bikramajit Singh, Raja (1782–1829)

Chhatarpur (complete list) –
Kunwar Sone Shah, Raja (1785–1816)

Chhota Udaipur (complete list) –
Arsisinhji, Maharawal (1762–1771)
Hamirsinhji II, Maharawal (1771–1777)
Bhimsinhji, Maharawal (1777–1822)

Kingdom of Cochin (complete list) –
Rama Varma IV, Maharaja (1697–1701)
Rama Varma V, Maharaja (1701–1721)
Ravi Varma III, Maharaja (1721–1731)
Rama Varma VI, Maharaja (1731–1746)
Veera Kerala Varma I, Maharaja (1746–1749)
Rama Varma VII, Maharaja (1749–1760)
Veera Kerala Varma II, Maharaja (1760–1775)
Rama Varma VIII, Maharaja (1775–1790)
Shaktan Thampuran, Maharaja (1790–1805)

Kingdom of Coorg (complete list) –
Dodda Virappa, Raja (1687–1736)
Chikka Virappa, Raja (1736–1766)
Muddu Raja II, Raja (1766-1770)
Devappa Raja, Raja (1770-1774)
Linga Raja, Raja (1774–1780)
Dodda Vira Rajendra, Raja (1780–1809)

Danta (complete list) –
Prithvisimhji Gajsinhji Barad Parmar, Maharana (1687–1743)
Vikramdeoji Barad Parmar, Maharana (1743)
Karansinhji Barad Parmar, Maharana (1743–?)
Ratansinhji Karansinhji Barad parmar, Maharana (18th century)
Abhaisinhji Barad Parmar, Maharana (?–1795)
Mansinhji II Abhaisinhji Barad Parmar, Maharana (1795–1800)
Jagatsinhji Abhaisinhji Barad Parmad, Maharana (1800–1823)

Datia (complete list) –
Ramchandra Singh, Rao (1706–1733)
Indrajit Singh, Rao (1733–1762)
Shatrujit Singh, Rao (1762–1801)

Dewas Junior (complete list) –
Jivaji Rao Puar "Dada Sahib", Raja (1728–1774)
Sadashiv Rao I Puar, Raja (1774–1790)
Rukmangad Rao Puar, Raja (1790–1817)

Dewas Senior (complete list) –
Tukoji Rao I Puar, Raja (1728–1754)
Rani Savitribai, Regent (f) (1754–1756)
Krishnaji Rao I Puar, Raja (1754–1789)
Rani Gangabai, Regent (f) (1789–1794)
Tukoji Rao II Puar, Raja (1789–1827)

Dhar (complete list) –
Udaji Raje I Pawar, Raja (1728–1732)
Anand Raje I Pawar, Raja (1732–1736)
Yeshwant Raje I Pawar, Raja (1736–1761)
Khande Raje Pawar, Raja (1761–1782)
Anand Raje II Pawar, Raja (1782–1807)

Dharampur (complete list) –
Sahadevji, Rana (1680–1727)
Ramdevji II, Rana (1727–1758)
Dharamdevji, Rana (1758–1774)
Narandevji I (Guman Singh), Rana (1774–1777)
Maharani Baiji Kushal, Regent (1774–1784)
Somdevji II (Abhay Singh), Rana (1777–1784)
Maharani Baiji Kushal Kunverba, Regent (1784–1800)
Rupdevji, Rana (1784–1807)

Dholpur (complete list) –
Gaj Singh, Rana (1699–1713)
Jaswant Singh, Rana (1713–1717)
Bhim Singh Rana, Rana (1717–1756)
Girdhar Pratap Singh, Rana (1756–1757)
Chhatar Singh, Rana (1757–1784)

Dhrangadhra (complete list) –
Gajsinhji II Raisinhji, Raj Sahib (1744/45–1782)
Raniji Jijibai Kunverba, Raj Sahib (1758–1782)
Jashwantsinhji II Gajsinhji, Raj Sahib (1782–1801)

Dhrol (complete list) –
Kaloji I Panchanji, Thakur Sahib (1644–1706)
Junhoji I Kaloji, Thakur Sahib (1706–1712)
Ketoji Junoji, Thakur Sahib (1712–1715)
Kaloji II Junoji, Thakur Sahib (1715–1716)
Vaghji Junoji, Thakur Sahib (1716–1760)
Jaysimhji I Vaghji, Thakur Sahib (1760–1781)
Junoji II Jaysimhji, Thakur Sahib (1781–1789)
Nathoji Junoji, Thakur Sahib (1789–?)

Dungarpur (complete list) –
Khuman Singh, Maharawal (1691–1702)
Ram Singh, Maharawal (1702–1730)
Shiv Singh, Maharawal (1730–1785)
Vairisal, Maharawal (1785–1790)
Fateh Singh, Maharawal (1790–1808)

Dutch India –

Faridkot (complete list) –
Hamir Singh, Raja (1763–1782)
Mohar Singh, Raja (1783–1798)
Charat Singh, Raja (1798–1804)

Garhwal Kingdom (complete list) –
Fateh Shah, King (1660–1708)
Upendra Shah, King (1708–1709)
Pradip Shah, King (1709–1772)
Lalit Shah, King (1772–1780)
Jayakrit Shah, King (1780–1786)
Pradyumna Shah, King (1786–1804)

Gondal (complete list) –
Sagramji I Kumbhoji, Thakur (1648–1713)
Haloji Sagramji, Thakur (1713–1752)
Kumbhoji II Haloji, Thakur (1752–1789)
Muluji Sagramji, Thakur (1789–1791)
Dajibhai Muluji, Thakur (1791–1800)
Devaji Sagramji, Thakur (1800–1812)

Gwalior State: Scindia (complete list) –
Ranoji Scindia, Maharaja (1731–1745)
Jayappaji Rao Scindia, Maharaja (1745–1755)
Jankoji Rao Scindia, Maharaja (1755–1761)
Kadarji Rao Scindia, Maharaja (1763–1764)
Manaji Rao Scindia, Maharaja (1764–1768)
Mahadaji Shinde, Maharaja (1768–1794)
Daulat Rao Sindhia, Maharaja (1794–1827)

Hyderabad
Nizam (complete list) –
Nizam-ul-Mulk, Nizam (1724–1748)
Nasir Jung, Nizam (1748–1750)
Muzaffar Jung, Nizam (1750–1751)
Salabat Jung, Nizam (1751–1762)
Ali Khan, Nizam (1762–1803)
Prime ministers (complete list) –
Muhammad Iwaz Khan, Prime minister (1724–1730)
Anwarullah Khan, Prime minister (1730–1742)
Khuda Banda Khan, Prime minister (1742–1748)
Shah Nawaz Khan, Prime minister (1748–1750, 1755–1758)
Raja Ragunath Das, Prime minister (1750–1752)
Syed Lashkar Khan Rukn ud-Daula, Prime minister (1752–1755)
Basalat Jung, Prime minister (1758–1761)
Vithal Sundar, Prime minister (1761–1765)
Musa Khan Nawab Rukn ud-Daula, Prime minister (1765–1775)
Viqar-ul-daula, Prime minister (1775–1781)
Arastu Jah, Prime minister (1781–1795)
Raja Shan Rai Rayan, Prime minister (1795–1797)
Arastu Jah, Prime minister (1797–1804)

Indore: Holkar (complete list) –
Maharajas (complete list) –
Malhar Rao Holkar, Maharaja (1731–1766)
Malerao Khanderao Holkar, Maharaja (1766–1767)
Ahalya Bai Holkar III, Regent (f) (1767–1795)
Rajmata Ahilya Devi Holkar, Maharaja (1767–1795)
Tukojirao Tanaji Holkar, Maharaja (1795–1797)
Kashirao Tukojirao Holkar, Maharaja (1797–1798)
Yashwantrao Holkar, Maharaja (1798–1811)

Jaipur Kingdom (complete list) –
Jai Singh II, King (1699–1743)
Ishwari Singh, King (1743–1750)
Madho Singh I, King (1750–1768)
Prithvi Singh II, King (1768–1778)
Pratap Singh of Jaipur, King (1778–1803)

Jaisalmer (complete list) –
Amar Singh, Maharawal (1661–1702)
Jaswant Singh, Maharawal (1702–1708)
Budh Singh, Maharawal (1708–1722)
Akhi Singh, Maharawal (1722–1762)
Mulraj II, Maharawal (1762–1820)

Janjira (complete list) –
Kasim Yaqut Khan II, Wazir (1676–1703)
Amabat Yaqut Khan II, Wazir (1703–1707)
Surur Yakut Khan II, Wazir (1707–1732)
Hasan Khan, Wazir (1732–1734)
Sumbul Khan, Wazir (1734–1737)
`Abd al-Rahman Khan, Wazir (1737–1740)
Hasan Khan (2nd time), Wazir (1740–1745)
Ibrahim Khan I, Wazir (1745–1757, 1757–1761)
Mohammad Khan I, Wazir (1757)
Yaqut Khan, Wazir (1761–1772)
`Abd al-Rahim Khan, Wazir (1772–1784)
Jauhar Khan, Wazir (1784–1789)
`Abd al-Karim Yaqut Khan, Wazir (1784–1789)
Ibrahim Khan II, Wazir (1789–1794)
Jumrud Khan, Wazir (1794–1803)

Jawhar (complete list) –
Patangshah I Vikramshah Mukne, Raja (1678–early 18th century)
Krishnashah II Patangshah Mukne, Raja (early 18th century–1742)
Vikramshah II Krishnashah Mukne, Raja (1742–1758)
Krishnashah III Vikramshah Mukne, Raja (1758–1765)
Patangshah II Krishnashah Mukne, Raja (1768–1798)
Vikramshah III Patangshah Mukne, Raja (1798–1821)

Jhabua (complete list) –
Kushal Singh, Raja (1677–1723)
Anup Singh, Raja (1723–1727)
Sheo Singh, Raja (1727–1758)
Bahadur Singh, Raja (1758–1770)
Bhim Singh, Raja (1770–1821)

Jind (complete list) –
Sukhachain, Raja (c.1676–1751)
Alam Singh, Raja (c.1764)
Bulki Singh, Raja (1700s)
Gajpat Singh, Raja (1763–1789)
Bhag Singh, Raja (1789–1819)

Jodhpur (complete list) –
Ajit Singh, Maharaja (1679–1724)
Abhai Singh, Maharaja (1724–1749)
Ram Singh, Maharaja (1749–1751, 1753–1772)
Bakht Singh, Maharaja (1751–1752)
Vijay Singh, Maharaja (1752–1753, 1772–1793)
Bhim Singh, Maharaja (1793–1803)

Junagadh (complete list) –
Muhammad Bahadur Khanji, Nawab (1730–1758)
Muhammad Mahabat Khanji l, Nawab (1758–1760, 1762–1774)
Muzaffar Khanji, Nawab (1760–1762)
Muhammad Hamid Khanji, Nawab (1774–1811)

Kalahandi (complete list) –
Jugasai Deo III, Raja (1693–1721)
Khadag Rai Deo, Raja (1721–1747)
Raisingh Deo III, Raja (1747–1771)
Purusottam Deo, Raja (1771–1796)
Jugasai Deo IV, Raja (1796–1831)

Kapurthala (complete list) –
Jassa Singh, Sardar (1777–1783)
Bagh Singh, Sardar (1783–1801)

Karauli (complete list) –
Kanwar Pal II, Maharaja (1691–1734)
Gopal Singh, Maharaja (1734–1757)
Tarsam Pal, Maharaja (1757–1772)
Manak Pal, Maharaja (1772–1804)

Khilchipur (complete list) –
Anup Singh II, Dewan (1679–1715)
Fateh Singh, Dewan (1718–1738)
Dewan (1738–1770)
Abhai Singh, Dewan (1770–1787)
Dip Singh, Dewan (1787–c.1795)
Durjan Sal, Dewan (1795–1819)

Kishangarh (complete list) –
Man Singh, Maharaja (1658–1706)
Raj Singh, Maharaja (1706–1748)
Bahadur Singh, Maharaja (1748–1781)
Samant Singh, Maharaja (1748–1765)
Sardar Singh, Maharaja (1765–1768)
Birad Singh, Maharaja (1781–1788)
Pratap Singh, Maharaja (1788–1798)
Kalyan Singh, Maharaja (1798–1839)

Kolhapur (complete list) –
Shivaji II, Raja (1710–1714)
Sambhaji II, Raja (1714–1760)
Jiji Bai, Regent (f) (1760–1773)
Shivaji III, Raja (1762–1813)

Kota (complete list) –
Ram Singh I, Maharao (1696–1707)
Bhim Singh I, Maharao (1713–1720)
Arjun Singh, Maharao (1720–1723)
Durjan Sal, Maharao (1723–1756)
Ajit Singh, Maharao (1756–1757)
Chhatar Sal Singh I, Maharao (1757–1764)
Guman Singh, Maharao (1764–1771)
Umaid Singh I, Maharao (1771–1819)

Kumaon Kingdom: Chand (complete list) –
Gyan Chand, King (1698–1708)
Jagat Chand, King (1708–1720)
Devi Chand, King (1720–1726)
Ajit Chand, King (1726–1729)
Kalyan Chand V, King (1729–1747)
Dip Chand, King (1747–1777)
Mohan Chand, King (1777–1779)
Pradyumna Chand, King (1779–1786)
Mohan Chand, King (1786–1788)
Shiv Chand, King (1788)
Mahendra Chand, King (1788–1790)

Kingdom of Kutch (complete list) –
Pragmalji I, King (1698–1715)
Godji I, King (1715–1719)
Deshalji I, King (1718–1752)
Lakhpatji, Regent (1741–1752)
Lakhpatji, King (1752–1760)
Godji II, King (1760–1778)
Rayadhan III, King (1778–1786, 1813)
Prithvirajji, King (1786–1801)
Fateh Muhammad, Regent (1786−1813)

Limbdi (complete list) –
Verisalji I Aderajj, Thakur Sahib (17th–18th century)
Askaranji III Verisalji, Thakur Sahib (early 18th century)
Aderajji II Askaranji, Thakur Sahib (early 18th century)
Verisalji II Aderajji, Thakur Sahib (mid 18th century)
Harbhanji I Verisalji, Thakur Sahib (?–1786)
Harisinhji Harbhanj, Thakur Sahib (1786–1825)

Lunavada (complete list) –
Bir Singh, Rana (1674–1711)
Nar Singh, Rana (1711–1735)
Wakhat Singh, Rana (1735–1757)
Dip Singh, Rana (1757–1782)
Durjan Singh, Rana (1782–1786)
Jagat Singh, Rana (1786)
Partab Singh, Rana (1786–1818)

Madurai Nayak dynasty (complete list) –
Rani Mangammal, Queen (1689–1704)
Vijaya Ranga Chokkanatha Nayak, King (1704–1731)
Meenakshi, Queen (1731–1736)

Maihar (complete list) –
Beni Singh, Thakur (1778–1788)
Rajdhar Singh, Thakur (1788–1790)
Durjan Singh, Thakur (1790–1825)
Bishan Singh, Thakur (1826–1850)
Mohan Prasad, Thakur (1850–1852)
Raghubir Singh, Thakur (1852–1869)
Regent (1852–1865)
Raghubir Singh, Raja (1869–1908)

Malerkotla (complete list) –
Sher Muhammad Khan Bahadur, Nawab (1672–1712)
Ghulam Husain Khan, Nawab (1712–1717)
Jamal Khan, Nawab (1717–1762)
Bhikan Khan, Nawab (1762–1763/64)
Khan Sahib Khan Bahadur Khan, Regent (1764–1766)
Khan Sahib Umar Khan, Nawab (1766–1780)
Khan Sahib Asadullah Khan, Nawab (1780–1784)
Khan Ataullah Khan, Nawab (1784–1809)

Mandi (complete list) –
Sidhi Sen, Raja (1684–1727 or 1678–1719)
Tikka Shiv Jawala Sen, Raja (1703 or 1722)
Shamsher Sen, Raja (1727–1781)
Surma Sen, Raja (1781–1788)
Ishwari Sen, Raja (1788–1826)

Maratha Empire (complete list) –
Tarabai, Chhatrapati (1700–1707)
Shahu I, Chhatrapati (1707–1749)
Rajaram II, Chhatrapati (1749–1777)
Shahu II, Chhatrapati (1777–1808)

Mayurbhanj (complete list) –
Savesvara Bhanj Deo, Raja (1688–1711)
Viravikramaditya Bhanj Deo, Raja (1711–1728)
Raghunath Bhanj Deo, Raja (1728–1750)
Chakradhar Bhanj Deo, Raja (1750–1761)
Damodar Bhanj Deo, Raja (1761–1796)
Rani Sumitra Devi, Regent (1796–1810)

Morvi (complete list) –
Kanyoji Rawaji, Thakur Sahib (1698–1733)
Aliyaji Kanyoji, Thakur Sahib (1733–1739)
Rawaji Aliyaji I, Thakur Sahib (1739–1764)
Pachanji Rawaji, Thakur Sahib (1764–1772)
Waghji I Rawaji, Thakur Sahib (1772–1783)
Hamirji Waghji, Thakur Sahib (1783–1790)
Jyaji Waghji, Thakur Sahib (1790–1828)

Mudhol (complete list) –
Sardar Akhayaji Raje Ghorpade, Raja (1700–1734)
Pirajirao Raje Ghorpade, Raja (1734–1737)
Malojirao III Raje Ghorpade, Raja (1737–1805)

Mughal Empire (complete list) –
Muhiuddin Muhammad Aurangzeb Alamgir, Emperor (1658–1707)
Muhammad Azam Shah, Emperor (1707)
Bahadur Shah I, Emperor (1707–1712)
Jahandar Shah, Emperor (1712–1713)
Farrukh Siyar, Emperor (1713–1719)
Rafi ud Darajat, Emperor (1719)
Rafi ud Daulah, Emperor (1719)
Nikusiyar, Emperor (1719)
Muhammad Shah, Emperor (1719–1720, 1720–1748)
Muhammad Ibrahim, Emperor (1720)
Ahmad Shah Bahadur, Emperor (1748–1754)
Alamgir II, Emperor (1754–1759)
Shah Jahan III, Emperor (1760)
Shah Alam II, Emperor (1759–1806)

Kingdom/Sultanate of Mysore
Maharajas (complete list) –
Chikka Devaraja, Maharaja (1673–1704)
Kanthirava Narasaraja II, Maharaja (1704–1714)
Dodda Krishnaraja I, Maharaja (1714–1732)
Chamaraja Wodeyar VII, Maharaja (1732–1734)
Krishnaraja Wodeyar II, Maharaja (1734–1761), puppet Maharaja (1761–1766)
Nanjaraja Wodeyar, puppet Maharaja (1766–1772)
Chamaraja Wodeyar VIII, puppet Maharaja (1772–1776)
Chamaraja Wodeyar IX, puppet Maharaja (1776–1796)
Krishnaraja Wodeyar III, Maharaja (1799–1868)
Sultans (complete list) –
Hyder Ali, Sultan (1761–1782)
Tipu Sultan, Sultan (1782–1799)

Nagod (complete list) –
Fakir Shah, Raja (1685–1721)
Chain Singh, Raja (1720–1748)
Ahlad Singh, Raja (1748–1780)
Lal Sheoraj Singh, Raja (1780–1818)

Nagpur kingdom (complete list) –
Raghoji I, King (1738–1755)
Janoji, King (1755–1772)
Sabaji, King (1772–1775)
Mudhoji, King (1775–1788)
Raghoji II, King (1788–1816, 1816–1818)

Nawanagar (complete list) –
Lakhaji Tamachi, Jam Saheb (1690–1708)
Raisinhji Lakhaji, Jam Saheb (1708–1711)
Tamachi Raisinhji, Jam Saheb (1711–1743)
Lakhaji Tamachi, Jam Saheb (1743–1767)
Jasaji Lakhaji, Jam Saheb (1767–1814)

Nayakas of Chitradurga (complete list) –
Bharamanna Nayaka, Chief 1689–1721)
Madakari Nayaka IV, Chief (1721–1748)
Kasturi Rangappa Nayaka II, Chief (1748–1758)
Madakari Nayaka, Chief (1758–1779)

Nayakas of Keladi (complete list) –
Basavappa Nayaka, Raja (1697–1714)
Somashekara Nayaka II, Raja (1714–1739)
Kiriya Basavappa Nayaka, Raja (1739–1754)
Chenna Basappa Nayaka, Raja (1754–1757)
Virammaji, Queen (1757–1763)

Orchha (complete list) –
Udwat Singh, Raja (1689–1735)
Prithvi Singh, Raja (1735–1752)
Sanwant Singh, Raja (1752–1765)
Hati Singh, Raja (1765–1768)
Man Singh, Raja (1768–1775)
Bharti Singh, Raja (1775–1776)
Vikramajit Mahendra, Raja (1776–1817)

Oudh (complete list) –
Saadat Ali Khan I, Nawab (1719–1737)
Safdarjung, Nawab (1737–1753)
Shuja-ud-Daula, Nawab (1753–1775)
Asaf-ud-Daula, Nawab (1775–1797)
Wazir Ali Khan, Nawab (1797–1798)
Saadat Ali Khan II, Nawab (1798–1814)

Palanpur (complete list) –
Firuz Kamal Khan, Diwan (1688–1704)
Kamal Khan, Diwan (1704–1708)
Firuz Khan II, Diwan (1708–1719)
Karim Dad Khan, Diwan (1719–1732)
Pahar Khan II, Diwan (1732–1743)
Bahadur Khan, Diwan (1743–1768)
Salim Khan I, Diwan (1768–1781)
Shir Khan, Diwan (1781–1788)
Mubariz Khan II, Diwan (1788–1793)
Shamshir Khan, Diwan (1793–1794)
Firuz Khan III, Diwan (1794–1812)

Palitana (complete list) –
Prithvirajji Kandhaji, Thakur Sahib (1697–1734)
Nonghanji III, Thakur Sahib (1734–?)
Sartanji II, Thakur Sahib (?–1766)
Alubhai, Thakur Sahib (1766–1770)
Undaji, Thakur Sahib (1770–1820)

Panna (complete list) –
Chhatrasal, Raja (1675–1731)
Hardesah Singh, Raja (1731–1739)
Sabha Singh, Raja (1739–1752)
Aman Singh, Raja (1752–1758)
Hindupat Singh, Raja (1758–1777)
Anirudh Singh, Raja (1777–1779)
interregnum, Raja (1779–1785)
Dhokal Singh, Raja (1785–1798)
Kishor Singh, Raja (1798–1834)

Patiala (complete list) –
Ala Singh, Maharaja (1761–1765)
Amar Singh, Maharaja (1765–1767)
Amar Singh, Raja (1767–1781)
Sahib Singh, Raja (1781–1810)

Patna (complete list) –
Chhatrasal, Raja (1675–1731)
Hardesah Singh, Raja (1731–1739)
Sabha Singh, Raja (1739–1752)
Aman Singh, Raja (1752–1758)
Hindupat Singh, Raja (1758–1777)
Anirudh Singh, Raja (1777–1779)
Dhokal Singh, Raja (1785–1798)
Kishor Singh, Raja (1798–1834)

Porbandar (complete list) –
Bhanji Sartanji, Rana (1699–1709)
Khimoji III, Rana (1709–1728)
Vikmatji III Khimoji, Rana (1728–1757)
Sartanji II Vikmatji, Rana (1757–1813)

Portuguese India –

Pratapgarh (complete list) –
Sawant Singh, Maharawat (1775–1844)

Pudukkottai (complete list) –
Raghunatha Raya Tondaiman, King (1686–1730)
Vijaya Raghunatha Raya Tondaiman I, King (1730–1769)
Raya Raghunatha Tondaiman, King (1769–1789)
Vijaya Raghunatha Tondaiman, King (1789–1807)

Radhanpur (complete list) –
Jawan Mard Khan II, Nawab (1753–1765)
Muhammad Najm ad-Din Khan, Nawab (1765–1787)
Muhammad Ghazi ad-Din Khan, Nawab (1787–1813)

Rajgarh (complete list) –
Mohan Singh, Rawat (1638–1714)
Amar Singh, Rawat (c.1714–1740)
Narpat Singh, Rawat (1740–1747)
Jagat Singh, Rawat (1747–1775)
Hamir Singh, Rawat (1775–1790)
Pratap Singh, Rawat (1790–1803)

Rajkot (complete list) –
Mehramamji II Bamaniaji, Thakur Sahib (1694–1720)
Masum Khan Shughaat, Governor (1720–1732)
Ranmalji I Mehramamji, Thakur Sahib (1732–1746)
Lakhaji I Ranmalji, Thakur Sahib (1746–?, 1794–1795)
Mehramamji III Lakhaji, Thakur Sahib (?–1794)
Ranmalji II Mehramamji, Thakur Sahib (1795–1825)

Rajpipla (complete list) –
Chatrasalji, Maharana (17th century–1705)
Verisalji I, Maharana (1705–1715)
Jitsinhji, Maharana (1715–1730)
Gomalsinghji, Maharana (1730–1754)
Dalilsinhji, usurper Maharana (1754)
Pratapsinhji, Maharana (1754–1764)
Raisinhji, Maharana (1764–1786)
Ajabsinhji, Maharana (1786–1803)
Naharsinhji, Regent (1793–1803)

Ramnad estate (complete list) –
Raghunatha Kilavan Sethupathi]], King (1678–1710)
Muthu Vairavanatha Sethupathi I]], King (1710–1712)
Muthu Vijaya Raghunatha Sethupathi]], King (1713–1725)
Sundaresvara Raghunatha Sethupathi]], King (1725)
Bavani Sangara Sethupathi, King (1725–1727)
Kumara Muthu Vijaya Raghunatha Sethupathi, King (1728–1735)
Sivakumara Muthu Vijaya Raghunatha Sethupathi, King (1735–1747)
Rakka Thevar Sethupathi, King (1748)
Sella Muthu Vijaya Raghunatha Sethupathi, King (1749–1762)
Muthuramalinga Vijaya Ragunatha Sethupathi I, King (1762–1772, 1781–1795)
Mangaleswari Nachiyar, King (1795–1803)

Rampur (complete list) –
Faizullah Khan, Nawab (1748–1793)
Hafiz Rahmat Khan, Regent (1748–1774)
Muhammad Ali Khan Bahadur, Nawab (1793–1793)
Ghulam Muhammad Khan Bahadur, Nawab (1793–1794)
Ahmad Ali Khan Bahadur, Nawab (1794–1840)

Ratlam (complete list) –
Chhatrasal, Raja (1695–1706)
Keshri Singh, Raja (1706–1716)
Pratap Singh, Raja (1716–1716)
Man Singh, Raja (1716–1743)
Prithvi Singh, Raja (1743–1773)
Padam Singh, Raja (1773–1800)
Parbat Singh, Raja (1800–1825)

Rewa (complete list) –
Avadhut Singh, Raja (1700–1755)
Ajit Singh, Raja (1755–1809)

Sachin (complete list) –
Abdul Karim Mohammad Yakut Khan I, Nawab (1791–1802)

Sailana (complete list) –
Jai Singh, Raja (1736–1757)
Jaswant Singh, Raja (1757–1772)
Ajab Singh, Raja (1772–1782)
Mokham Singh, Raja (1782–1797)
Lakshman Singh, Raja (1797–1826)

Sangli (complete list) –
Gangadharrao, Regent (1782–1801)
Chintaman I, Rao (1782–1851)

Sawantwadi (complete list) –
Khem Savant II Bhonsle, Raja Sar Desai (1675–1709)
Phond Savant II Bhonsle, Raja Sar Desai (1709–1738)
Jayram Sawant Bhonsle, Regent (1738–1753)
Ramachandra Savant I Bhonsle, Raja Sar Desai (1738–1755)
Soubhagyavati Janaki Bai Bhonsle, Regent (f) (1755–1763)
Khem Savant III Bhonsle, Raja Sar Desai (1755–1763)
Khem Savant III, Raja Bahadur (1763–1803)

Shahpura (complete list) –
Bharat Singh, Raja Dhiraj (1706–1729)
Umaid Singh I, Raja Dhiraj (1729–1769)
Ram Singh, Raja Dhiraj (1769–1774)
Bhim Singh, Raja Dhiraj (1774–1796)
Regent (1796–c.1802)
Amar Singh, Raja Dhiraj (1796–1827)

Sirmur (complete list) –
Mat Prakash, Raja (1684–1704)
Hari Prakash, Raja (1704–1712)
Bijay Prakash, Raja (1712–1736)
Pratap Prakash, Raja (1736–1754)
Kirat Prakash, Raja (1754–1770)
Jagat Prakash, Raja (1770–1789)
Dharam Prakash, Raja (1789–1793)
Karam Prakash II, Raja (1793–1803)

Sirohi (complete list) –
Durjan Singh, Rao (1697–1705)
Umaid Singh I, Rao (1705–1749)
Prithvi Singh, Rao (1749–1773)
Takhat Singh, Rao (1773–1781)
Regent (1773–1781)
Jagat Singh, Rao (1773–1782)
Verisalji II, Rao (1782–1808)

Sisodia (complete list) –
Amar Singh II, Rajput (1698–1710)
Sangram Singh II, Rajput (1710–1734)
Jagat Singh II, Rajput (1734–1751)
Pratap Singh II, Rajput (1751–1754)
Raj Singh II, Rajput (1754–1762)
Ari Singh II, Rajput (1762–1772)
Hamir Singh II, Rajput (1772–1778)
Bhim Singh, Rajput (1778–1828)

Sitamau (complete list) –
Kesho Das, Raja (1701–1748)
Gaj Singh, Raja (1748–1752)
Fateh Singh, Raja (1752–1802)

Sonepur (complete list) –
Raj Singh Deo, Raja (1700–1725)
Achal Singh Deo, Raja (1725–1750)
Divya Singh Deo, Raja (1750–1770)
Jarawar Singh Deo, Raja (1770–1771)
Sobha Singh Deo, Raja (1771–1786)
Prithvi Singh Deo, Raja (1786–1841)

Suket (complete list) –
Jit Sen, Raja (1663–1721)
Garur Sen, Raja (1721–1748)
Bhikam Sen, Raja (1748–1762)
Ranjit Sen, Raja (1762–1791)
Bikram Sen II, Raja (1791–1838)

Thanjavur Maratha kingdom (complete list) –
Shahuji I, Raja (1684–1712)
Serfoji I, Raja (1712–1728)
Tukkoji, Raja (1728–1736)
Ekoji II, Raja (1736–1737)
Sujana Bai, Raja (1737–1738)
Shahuji II, Raja (1738–1739)
Pratap Singh, Raja (1739–1763)
Thuljaji, Raja (1763–1787)
Serfoji II, Raja (1787–1793, 1798–1799)
Ramaswami Amarasimha Bhonsle, Raja (1793–1798)

Travancore
Maharajas (complete list) –
Marthanda Varma, Maharaja (1729–1758)
Dharma Raja, Maharaja (1758–1798)
Balarama Varma, Maharaja (1798–1810)
Diwans (complete list) –
Arumukham Pillai, Dalawa (1729–1736)
Thanu Pillai, Dalawa (1736–1737)
Ramayyan Dalawa, Dalawa (1737–1756)
Martanda Pillai, Dalawa (1756–1763)
Warkala Subbayyan, Dalawa (1763–1768)
Krishna Gopalayyan, Dalawa (1768–1776)
Vadiswaran Subbrahmanya Iyer, Dalawa (1776–1780)
Mullen Chempakaraman Pillai, Dalawa (1780–1782)
Nagercoil Ramayyan, Dalawa (1782–1788)
Krishnan Chempakaraman, Dalawa (1788–1789)
Raja Kesavadas, Dalawa (1789–1798)
Jayanthan Sankaran Nampoothiri, Dalawa (1798–1799)
Velu Thampi Dalawa, Dalawa (1799–1809)

Tripura: Manikya dynasty (complete list) –
Ratna Manikya II, Maharaja (1685–1693, 1695–1712)
Mahendra Manikya, Maharaja (1712–1714)
Dharma Manikya II, Maharaja (1714–1725, 1729)
Jagat Manikya, Maharaja (1725–1729)
Mukunda Manikya, Maharaja (1729–1739)
Joy Manikya II, Maharaja (1739–1744)
Indra Manikya II, Maharaja (1744–1746)
Vijaya Manikya III, Maharaja (1746–1748)
Lakshman Manikya (c.1750s)
Krishna Manikya, Maharaja (1760–1783)
Rajdhar Manikya II, Maharaja (1785–1806)

Udaipur (complete list) –
Amar Singh II, Maharana (1698–1710)
Sangram Singh II, Maharana (1710–1734)
Jagat Singh II, Maharana (1734–1751)
Pratap Singh II, Maharana (1751–1754)
Raj Singh II, Maharana (1754–1761)
Ari Singh II, Maharana (1761–1773)
Hamir Singh II, Maharana (1773–1778)
Bhim Singh, Maharana (1778–1828)

Wadhwan (complete list) –
Bhagatsinhji Udaisinhji, Thakur Sahib (1681–1707)
Arjansinhji Madhavsinhji, Thakur Sahib (1707–1739)
Sabalsinhji Arjansinhji II, Thakur Sahib (1739–1765)
Chandrasinhji Sabalsinhji, Thakur Sahib (1765–1778)
Prithirajji Chandrasinhji, Thakur Sahib (1778–1807)

Wankaner (complete list) –
Chandrasinhji I Raisinhji, Maharana Raj Shri (1679–1721)
Prithvirajji Chandrasinhji, Maharana Raj Shri (1721–1728)
Kesarisinhji I Chandrasinhji, Maharana Raj Shri (1728–1749)
Bharoji Kesarisinhji, Maharana Raj Shri (1749–1784)
Kesarisinhji II Raisinhji, Maharana Raj Shri (1784–1787)
Chandrasinhji II Kesarisinhji, Maharana Raj Shri (1787–1839)

Yawnghwe (complete list) –
Hkam Leng, Saopha (1695–1733)
Htawk Sha Sa, Saopha (1733–1737)
Hsi Ton Sa, Saopha (1737–1746)
Hke Hsa Wa, Saopha (1746–1758)
Naw Mong I, Saopha (1758)
Yawt Hkam, Saopha (1758–1761)
Hpong Hpa Ka-sa, Saopha (1761–1762)
Sao Yun, Saopha (1762–1815)

Zamorin of Calicut (complete list) –
Nileswaram Tirunal, Samoothiri (1706–1707)
Samoothiri from Kilakke Kovilakam (1741–1746)
Samoothiri from Putiya Kovilakam (1746–1758)
Samoothiri from Kilakke Kovilakam (1758–1766)
Samoothiri from Putiya Kovilakam (1766–1788)
Kerala Varma Vikrama, Samoothiri (1788–1798)
Krishna Varma, Samoothiri (1798–1806)

Maldives 

Sultanate of the Maldives (complete list) –
Isdhoo dynasty
Ali V, Sultan (1701)
Hasan X, Sultan (1701)
Ibrahim Mudzhiruddine, Sultan (1701–1704)
Dhiyamigili dynasty
Muhammad Imaduddin II, Sultan (1704–1720)
Ibrahim Iskandar II, Sultan (1720–1750)
Muhammad Imaduddin III, Sultan (1750–1757)
Amina I, Sultana (1753–1754)
Amina II, Sultana (1757–1759)
Huraa dynasty
Hasan 'Izz ud-din, Sultan (1759–1766)
Dhiyamigili dynasty
Muhammed Ghiya'as ud-din, Sultan (1766–1774)
Huraa dynasty
Muhammad Shamsuddeen II, Sultan (1774)
Muhammad Mu'iz ud-din, Sultan (1774–1779)
Hassan Nooraddeen I, Sultan (1779–1799)
Muhammad Mueenuddeen I, Sultan (1799–1835)

Nepal 

Gorkha Kingdom –
Prithvipati Shah, King (1673–1716)
Nara Bhupal Shah, King (1716–1743)
Prithvi Narayan Shah, King of Gorkha (1743–1768), King of Nepal (1768–1775)

Kingdom of Nepal
Kings (complete list) –
Prithvi Narayan Shah, King of Gorkha (1743–1768), King of Nepal (1768–1775)
Pratap Singh Shah, King (1775–1777)
Rana Bahadur Shah, King (1777–1799)
Girvan Yuddha Bikram Shah, King (1799–1816)
Mulkajis –
Abhiman Singh Basnet, Mulkaji (1785–1794)
Kirtiman Singh Basnyat, Mulkaji (1794–1801)
Prime ministers (complete list) –
Damodar Pande, Prime minister (1799–1804)

Malla rulers of Kantipur (complete list) –
Bhaskara Malla, Raja (1700–1714)
Mahendrasimha Malla, Raja (1714–1722)
Jagajjaya Malla, Raja (1722–1736)
Jaya Prakash Malla, Raja (1736–1746, 1750–1768)
Jyoti Prakash Malla, Raja (1746–1750)

Malla rulers of Lalitpur (complete list) –
Yoga Narendra Malla, Raja (1685–1705)
Loka Prakash Malla, Raja (1705–1706)
Indra Malla, Raja (1706–1709)
Vira Narasimha Malla, Raja (1709)
Vira Mahindra Malla, Raja (1709–1715)
Riddhi Narasimha, Raja (1715–1717)
Mahindra Simha, King (1717–1722)
Yoga Prakash Malla, Raja (1722–1729)
Vishnu Malla, Raja (1729–1745)
Rajya Prakash Malla, Raja (1745–1758)
Vishvajit Malla, Raja (1758–1760)
Jaya Prakash Malla, King (1760–1761, 1763–1764)
Ranajit Malla, King (1762–1763)
Dala Mardan Shah, Raja (1764–1765)
Tej Narasimha Malla, Raja (1765–1768)

Pakistan 

Bahawalpur (complete list) –
Sadiq I, Nawab (1723–1746)
Bahawal I, Nawab (1746–1750)
Mubarak II, Nawab (1750–1772)
Bahawal II, Nawab (1772–1809)

Khairpur (complete list) –
Sohrab Khan Talpur, Mir (1783–1830)

Khanate of Kalat (complete list) –
Samandar Khan Ahmadzai, Wali (1697–1714)
Mir Ahmad II Khan Ahmadzai, Wali (1714–1716)
Mir Abdullah Khan Ahmadzai, Wali (1716–1731)
Mir Muhabbat Khan Ahmadzai, Wali (1731–1739), Khan (1739–1749)
Muhammad Nasir Khan I Ahmadzai, Khan (1749–1794)
Mahmud Khan I Ahmadzai, Khan (1794–1817)

Sikh Empire (complete list) –
Jamadar Khushal Singh, Wazir (1799–1818)

Sri Lanka 

Dutch Ceylon (complete list) –
Colony, 1656–1796
For details see the Dutch Republic under Western Europe

Kingdom of Kandy (complete list) –
Vimaladharmasurya II, King (1687–1707)
Vira Narendra Sinha, King (1707–1739)
Sri Vijaya Rajasinha, King (1739–1747)
Kirti Sri Rajasinha, King (1747–1782)
Rajadhi Rajasinha, King (1782–1798)
Sri Vikrama Rajasinha, King (1798–1815)

See also
 List of governors of dependent territories in the 19th century
 List of state leaders in the 19th-century Holy Roman Empire
 List of state leaders in 20th-century British South Asia
 List of state leaders in the 18th century
 List of state leaders in the 19th century
 List of state leaders in the 20th century

References 

18th century
 
-
18th century in India